Shamoy T. Thompson (born 27 May 1997) is a British Virgin Islands football player who currently plays for the HBA Panthers and One Love United.

International career
Thompson has represented BVI at under 17 and full international level. He was a very talented young player that was part of the under 17 side beaten by Trinidad and Tobago 23-0 in 2012. He was called up in 2015 for a game against Antigua and Barbuda.

References

External links
 
 
 Shamoy Thompson at CaribbeanFootballDatabase

Living people
1997 births
British Virgin Islands footballers
British Virgin Islands international footballers
Association football midfielders
British Virgin Islands youth international footballers